Olivera Lakić is a Montenegrin investigative journalist for the Montenegrin newspaper Vijesti. In May 2018, she was wounded by a gunman after investigating corruption in Montenegro. She became an International Women of Courage Award recipient in 2019.

References

Living people
Montenegrin journalists
Montenegrin women activists
Montenegrin human rights activists
Shooting survivors
Year of birth missing (living people)
Montenegrin women journalists
21st-century journalists
Recipients of the International Women of Courage Award